The Bishop of Tasmania is the diocesan bishop of the Anglican Diocese of Tasmania, Australia.

List of Bishops of Tasmania

John Vernon Kestell Cornish (13 October 193126 January 1982) was consecrated 19 May 1979 at St George's Cathedral, Perth, to serve as Assistant Bishop of Perth. He was elected Bishop of Tasmania (to succeed Davies) in 1981, but died suddenly, after moving to Hobart but before his scheduled enthronement; Newell was elected in his stead the same year.
References

External links

 – official site

 
Lists of Anglican bishops and archbishops
Anglican bishops of Tasmania